The following radio stations broadcast on FM frequency 107.9 MHz:

Argentina
 Cristal in Rosario, Santa Fe
 Vida Santa Fe in Santa Fe de la Vera Cruz, Santa Fe
 Identidad in Bragado, Buenos Aires
 Sol in Crespo, Entre Ríos
 Ultra in La Plata, Buenos Aires
 Panda in Buenos Aires
 La Isla in San Fernando del Valle de Catamarca, Catamarca
 La Estación in Salta, Salta
 Del norte in Corrientes

Australia
 2AIR in Coffs Harbour, New South Wales
 4ROK in Rockhampton, Queensland
 3PNN in Bairnsdale, Victoria
 5RAM in Adelaide, South Australia
 2ICE in Lithgow, New South Wales
 6CCR in Fremantle, Western Australia
 Radio National in Eden, New South Wales
 Radio National in Rosebery, Tasmania
 Sky Sports Radio in Yass, New South Wales
 2COW in Casino, New South Wales

Canada (Channel 300)
 CFML-FM/VF2448 in Burnaby, British Columbia
 CFSI-FM in Salt Spring Island, British Columbia
 CFSM-FM-1 in Fernie, British Columbia
 CFTA-FM in Amherst, Nova Scotia
 CHUC-FM in Cobourg, Ontario
 CIBM-FM-1 in Riviere-du-Loup, Quebec
 CILS-FM in Victoria, British Columbia
 CIRI-FM in Calgary, Alberta
 CJNU-FM in Winnipeg, Manitoba
 CJXY-FM in Burlington, Ontario
 CKDJ-FM in Ottawa, Ontario
 CKFT-FM in Fort Saskatchewan, Alberta
 CKPP-FM in Prescott, Ontario

China 
 CNR China Rural Radio in Donggang
 CNR Easy Radio in Xiamen, Zhangzhou and south of Quanzhou

Greece
 Radio Fani in Xania
 Court Radio in Halkidiki
 H Fonh ton Litochorou in Katerini
 Chocolate FM in Kalamata

Indonesia
 Hang Tuah FM in Batam and Singapore

Malaysia
 Bernama Radio in Kota Kinabalu, Sabah
 Minnal FM in Taiping, Perak
 Radio Klasik in Kuantan, Pahang
 rakita in Klang Valley

Mexico
 XHCHZ-FM in Chiapa de Corzo, Chiapas
 XHCSM-FM in San Luis Potosí, San Luis Potosí
 XHDAB-FM in Hidalgo del Parral, Chihuahua
 XHEMA-FM in Fresnillo, Zacatecas
 XHEMIT-FM in Comitán de Domínguez, Chiapas
 XHFH-FM in Agua Prieta, Sonora
 XHIMR-FM in Mexico City
 XHJP-FM in Santa María Tlahuitoltepec, Oaxaca
 XHPC-FM in Piedras Negras, Coahuila
 XHPED-FM in San Pedro Tapanatepec, Oaxaca
 XHQG-FM in La Noria, Querétaro
 XHRCV-FM in San Antonino Castillo Velasco, Oaxaca
 XHRHI-FM in Uruapan, Michoacán
 XHRIG-FM in Villa Tututepec, Oaxaca
 XHSCAK-FM in Taxco de Alarcón, Guerrero
 XHSCAN-FM in Cabo San Lucas, Baja California Sur
 XHSCAS-FM in Chilpancingo, Guerrero
 XHSCBH-FM in Ensenada, Baja California
 XHSCDG-FM in Tlapa De Comonfort, Guerrero
 XHSCFY-FM in Coahuayana, Michoacán
 XHSCIU-FM in Tlahualilo, Durango
 XHSIBH-FM in Vicam, Guaymas municipality, Sonora
 XHSIBI-FM in Ejido Ignacio Allende, Tenosique municipality, Tabasco
 XHSLR-FM in San Luis Río Colorado, Sonora
 XHTEQ-FM in Tequila, Jalisco
 XHTFM-FM in Mazatlán Villa de Flores, Oaxaca
 XHTM-FM in Tepalcatepec, Michoacán
 XHTUMI-FM in El Malacate, Michoacán
 XHUGO-FM in Ocotlán, Jalisco
 XHVIC-FM in Ciudad Victoria, Tamaulipas
 XHWE-FM in Irapuato, Guanajuato
 XHYRE-FM in Mérida, Yucatán
 XHZV-FM in Zapotitlán de Vadillo, Jalisco

Philippines
 DWOK-FM in Puerto Princesa City
 DYNY in Iloilo City
 DXNY in Cagayan De Oro City
 DYDT in Toledo City
 DXWG in Tagum City

Taiwan 
 Transfer CNR Easy Radio in Kinmen

United Kingdom
 Afan FM (Port Talbot frequency)
 CamGlen Radio (Rutherglen and Cambuslang)
 GTFM
 KMFM Medway
 L107
 Oak FM in Leicestershire
 Jack 2 (radio station)
 Islands FM (formerly known as Radio Scilly)
 Star Radio (Cambridge and Ely)
 Greatest Hits Radio South Yorkshire (Bassetlaw frequency)
 The Cat (Crewe and Nantwich)

United States (Channel 300)
 KAOX in Shelley, Idaho
 KASP-LP in Aspen, Colorado
 KBDL-LP in Carbondale, Colorado
 KBKL in Grand Junction, Colorado
 KBPL in Pueblo, Colorado
 KBQI in Albuquerque, New Mexico
 KCKO in Rio Rico, Arizona
 KCLQ in Lebanon, Missouri
 KCYE in Meadview, Nevada
 KEAE-LP in Eagle, Colorado
 KELQ in Flandreau, South Dakota
 KEYB in Altus, Oklahoma
 KEYJ-FM in Abilene, Texas
 KEZA in Fayetteville, Arkansas
 KFAN-FM in Johnson City, Texas
 KFIN in Jonesboro, Arkansas
 KFMW in Waterloo, Iowa
 KDXX in Lewisville, Texas
 KGCE-LP in Modesto, California
 KGCO-LP in Crete, Nebraska
 KHDV in Darby, Montana
 KHEZ-LP in Cape Girardeau, Missouri
 KHOA-LP in Hope, Arkansas
 KHPE in Albany, Oregon
 KHXT in Erath, Louisiana
 KIMI in Humboldt, Nebraska
 KINF-LP in Palestine, Texas
 KIVD-LP in Bossier City, Louisiana
 KIXS in Victoria, Texas
 KJCR-LP in Grants Pass, Oregon
 KJHS-LP in Wenatchee, Washington
 KJTM-LP in Lincoln, Nebraska
 KKLC in Fall River Mills, California
 KKOL-FM in Aiea, Hawaii
 KKRF in Stuart, Iowa
 KLEV-LP in Leadville, Colorado
 KLLE in North Fork, California
 KLNX-LP in Minturn, Colorado
 KLTE in Kirksville, Missouri
 KMBI-FM in Spokane, Washington
 KMLE in Chandler, Arizona
 KNJR-LP in Moorpark, California
 KOUV-LP in Vancouver, Washington
 KOXC-LP in Oxnard, California
 KPAW in Fort Collins, Colorado
 KPFX in Kindred, North Dakota
 KPPA-LP in Mexia, Texas
 KPRT-FM in Kirtland, New Mexico
 KQEL in Alamogordo, New Mexico
 KQLM in Odessa, Texas
 KQQK in Beaumont, Texas
 KQQL in Anoka, Minnesota
 KQRU-LP in Santa Clarita, California
 KRFL-LP in Fulton, Missouri
 KRLG-LP in Kremmling, Colorado
 KRLY-LP in Alpine, California
 KRQC-LP in Davenport, Iowa
 KRVJ-LP in Jacksonville, Texas
 KRVK in Vista West, Wyoming
 KSEA in Greenfield, California
 KTGY-LP in Nipomo, California
 KTIC-FM in West Point, Nebraska
 KTLH in Hallsville, Texas
 KUMP-LP in Days Creek, Oregon
 KUMT in Randolph, Utah
 KUZZ-FM in Bakersfield, California
 KVLY in Edinburg, Texas
 KVTS-LP in Republic, Missouri
 KWLS in Winfield, Kansas
 KWPW in Robinson, Texas
 KWVE-FM in San Clemente, California
 KXLT-FM in Eagle, Idaho
 KXVR-LP in Corpus Christi, Texas
 KXWF-LP in Wichita Falls, Texas
 KXZT in Newell, South Dakota
 KYRF-LP in Yakima, Washington
 KYXZ-LP in Arroyo Grande, California
 KZIS in Sacramento, California
 KZLM in Lewistown, Montana
 KZRK-FM in Canyon, Texas
 KZRS in Great Bend, Kansas
 KZSR-LP in Paso Robles, California
 WAJF-LP in Decatur, Alabama
 WAMW-FM in Washington, Indiana
 WBCV in Wausau, Wisconsin
 WBQK in West Point, Virginia
 WBTB-LP in Erie, Pennsylvania
 WBTF in Midway, Kentucky
 WCDD in Canton, Illinois
 WCDY in McBain, Michigan
 WCFT-LP in Dover, New Jersey
 WCRZ in Flint, Michigan
 WCVQ in Fort Campbell, Kentucky
 WDBN in Wrightsville, Georgia
 WDRW-LP in Athens, Georgia
 WDSG-LP in Sanford, North Carolina
 WDSY-FM in Pittsburgh, Pennsylvania
 WDTF-LP in Berkeley Springs, West Virginia
 WEAT in West Palm Beach, Florida
 WEBE in Westport, Connecticut
 WEES-LP in Ocean City, Maryland
 WELV-LP in Ellenville, New York
 WEMM-FM in Huntington, West Virginia
 WENZ in Cleveland, Ohio
 WFBS-LP in Salem, South Carolina
 WFCA in Ackerman, Mississippi
 WFMX in Skowhegan, Maine
 WFSD-LP in Tallahassee, Florida
 WGTR in Bucksport, South Carolina
 WGUP-LP in Laplace, Louisiana
 WHTA in Hampton, Georgia
 WIMM-LP in Owensboro, Kentucky
 WJED-LP in Guanica, Puerto Rico
 WJFX in New Haven, Indiana
 WJPV-LP in Gainesville, Georgia
 WJXC-LP in Jackson, Mississippi
 WJZP-LP in Portland, Maine
 WKIO in Arcola, Illinois
 WKPA in Port Matilda, Pennsylvania
 WKRF in Tobyhanna, Pennsylvania
 WKYR-FM in Burkesville, Kentucky
 WLDV in Frederiksted, U.S. Virgin Islands
 WLEY-FM in Aurora, Illinois
 WLHZ-LP in Springfield, Massachusetts
 WLJD in Charlevoix, Michigan
 WLJX-LP in Springfield, Illinois
 WLLU-LP in Decatur, Illinois
 WLNK in Charlotte, North Carolina
 WLPV-LP in Greenfield, Massachusetts
 WLXM-LP in Lexington, South Carolina
 WLZL in College Park, Maryland
 WMCB-LP in Greenfield, Massachusetts
 WMDI-LP in Lakewood, New Jersey
 WMFM in Key West, Florida
 WMLZ-LP in Temperance, Michigan
 WMRK-FM in Orrville, Alabama
 WMUS in Muskegon, Michigan
 WNBI-LP in New Buffalo, Michigan
 WNCT-FM in Greenville, North Carolina
 WNDN in Chiefland, Florida
 WNTR in Indianapolis, Indiana
 WOGT in East Ridge, Tennessee
 WOLD-LP in Woodbridge, New Jersey
 WOTH in Williamsport, Pennsylvania
 WPFM in Panama City, Florida
 WPHC-LP in Spring Hill, Florida
 WPPZ-FM in Pennsauken, New Jersey
 WQET-LP in Middletown, New York
 WQJC-LP in Quincy, Illinois
 WRFA-LP in Jamestown, New York
 WRML-LP in Mays Landing, New Jersey
 WRWN in Port Royal, South Carolina
 WSRX-LP in Vernon, New Jersey
 WSRZ-FM in Coral Cove, Florida
 WSSY-LP in Greensboro, North Carolina
 WUAF-LP in Lake City, Florida
 WUCR-LP in Lake Butler, Florida
 WVAC-FM in Adrian, Michigan
 WVMB-LP in Madison, Alabama
 WVMX in Westerville, Ohio
 WVPJ-LP in Mayaguez, Puerto Rico
 WVPS in Burlington, Vermont
 WWAG in McKee, Kentucky
 WWHT in Syracuse, New York
 WWMA-LP in Avon Park, Florida
 WWPH in Princeton Junction, New Jersey
 WWRQ-FM in Valdosta, Georgia
 WXKS-FM in Medford, Massachusetts
 WXRU-LP in Piedmont, South Carolina
 WYHJ-LP in Gulf Breeze, Florida
 WYKQ-LP in Aguadilla-Aguada, Puerto Rico
 WYYD in Amherst, Virginia
 WZEN-LP in Hammond, Louisiana
 WZKX in Bay Saint Louis, Mississippi

References

Lists of radio stations by frequency